Carlota is a Catalan, German, Portuguese, Spanish, and Swedish feminine given name that is an alternate form of Charlotte and a feminine form of Charlot and Carl. Notable people known by this name include the following:

Given name 

 Carlota of Mexico, Princess Marie Charlotte Amélie Augustine Victoire Clémentine Léopoldine of Belgium (1840–1927)
 Carlota Alfaro (born 1933), Puerto Rican fashion designer
 Carlota Castrejana (born 1973), triple jumper from Spain
 Carlota Ciganda (born 1990), professional golfer from Spain
 Carlota De Camargo Nascimento (Loty) (1904–1974), Brazilian sculptor and poet
 Carlota de Godoy y Borbón, 2nd Duchess of Sueca, Spanish noble
 Carlota Pereira de Queirós (1892–1982), Brazilian feminist and politician
 Carlota Escutia Dotti, Spanish geologist
 Carlota D. EspinoZa (born 1943), American painter
 Carlota Ferreira (1838 – c. 1912), Uruguayan woman
 Carlota Garrido de la Peña (1870-1958), Argentine journalist, writer, teacher
 Carlota Gooden (born 1936), Panamanian sprinter
 Carlota Jaramillo, stage name of María Isabel Carlota Jaramillo, (1904–1987), Ecuadorian singer
 Carlotta Minna Labowsky, known as Lotte Labowsky (1905–1991), Jewish German classicist
 Carlota Joaquina of Spain, Carlota Joaquina Teresa Caetana, Queen consort of Portugal (1775, 1830)
 Carlota Lozano (born 1945), Panamanian beauty queen
 Carlota Lucumí, Carlota (rebel leader) (died 1844), African-born enslaved Cuban woman of Yoruba origin
 Carlota Matienzo (1881–1926), Puerto Rican teacher and feminist
 Carlota O'Neill (1905–2000), Spanish feminist writer and journalist
 Carlota Perez (born 1939), Venezuelan economist
 Carlota Petchamé (born 1990), field hockey player
 Carlota S. Smith (1934–2007), American linguist
 Carlota Sosa (born 1957), Spanish-born Venezuelan actress
 Carlota Ulloa (born 1944), Chilean hurdling athlete

Middle name 
 Princess Maria Luisa Carlota of Parma (1802–1857), Princess of Parma and member of the House of Bourbon

Fictional
 Carlota Casagrande, a character from The Casagrandes

See also 

Carloto
Carlotta (name)

Notes 

Catalan feminine given names
German feminine given names
Portuguese feminine given names
Spanish feminine given names
Swedish feminine given names